Many (/ˈmɛni/) may refer to:

 grammatically plural in number
an English quantifier used with count nouns indicating a large but indefinite number of; at any rate, more than a few

Place names
 Many, Moselle, a commune of the Moselle department in France
 Mány, a village in Hungary
 Many, Louisiana, a town in the United States
 Many, Masovian Voivodeship, east-central Poland

Surname
 Moshe Many, Israeli urologist; President of Tel Aviv University, and President of Ashkelon Academic College.